May Be Some Time is a science fiction novella by Brenda Clough. It was first published in Analog Science Fiction and Fact in April 2001, and subsequently republished in the Year's Best Science Fiction: Nineteenth Annual Collection (2002), in the Mammoth Book of Best New Science Fiction: 15th Annual Collection (2002), and the Fifth Science Fiction Megapack: 25 Modern and Classic Science Fiction Stories (2012); as well, it appeared as the first portion of Clough's 2008 novel Revise the World.

Synopsis
Lawrence "Titus" Oates wakes up in a hospital bed in the year 2045, and learns that the future which rescued him is an even more challenging environment than the Antarctic.

Reception

May Be Some Time was a finalist for the 2002 Hugo Award for Best Novella and the Nebula Award for Best Novella of 2001.

References

Science fiction short stories